Abras orthobunyavirus, also called Abras virus (ABRV), is a species of virus in the genus Orthobunyavirus. Isolated from Culex adamesi and C. paracrybda in Ecuador. Not reported to cause disease in humans.

References 

Orthobunyaviruses